Merlini may refer to:

People
 Bautista Merlini (born 1995), Argentine football midfielder 
 David Merlini (born 1978), Hungarian escape artist
 Domenico Merlini (1730–1797), Polish-Italian architect
 Elsa Merlini (1903–1983), Italian film actress
 Giovanni Merlini (1795-1873), Italian Roman Catholic priest
 Marisa Merlini (1923–2008), Italian character actress 
 Milinka Merlini (1929–1996), Serbian and French chess master
 Orlando Merlini (died in 1510), Italian painter
 Richard Merlini (b. 1965), Canadian politician
 Robert Merlini (born Robert Robbins; 1929–1964), Australian illusionist, stage performer and television performer

Other
 Pseudhymenochirus merlini, a species of frog
 The Great Merlini, fictional detective
 Vita Merlini, a work by author Geoffrey of Monmouth